Margaret Gray (1913–2010) was a teacher and school head, most notably serving as  head of the Godolphin and Latymer School from 1963 to 1973.

The daughter of a minister, she moved from Scotland to London at age 11. She was schooled in Brighton, and educated at Newnham College of Cambridge University, and Smith College.

She started her teaching career at Westcliff High School for Girls. After World War II, she was made head of Skinners' Company's School for Girls.

In 2002 her children's book The Ugly Princess and the Wise Fool was published by Scholastic. In 2004 a prequel The Lovesick Salesman was published. Both were illustrated by Randy Cecil.

Gray never married. She died in 2010.

References

1913 births
2010 deaths
Schoolteachers from Essex
Alumni of Newnham College, Cambridge
Smith College alumni
Heads of schools in England